Connecticut's 29th State Senate district elects one member of the Connecticut State Senate. It consists of the towns of Brooklyn, Canterbury, Killingly, Mansfield, Scotland, Putnam, Thompson, and Windham. It has been represented by Democrat Mae Flexer since 2015.

Recent elections

2020

2018

2016

2014

2012

References

29